Rufus Frank Milwee (March 16, 1872 – January 29, 1955) was an American politician. He was a member of the Arkansas House of Representatives, serving from 1919 to 1925. He was a member of the Democratic party.

References

1955 deaths
1871 births
People from Monroe County, Arkansas
Speakers of the Arkansas House of Representatives
Democratic Party members of the Arkansas House of Representatives